James Downey may refer to:

 James Downey (Internet performance artist) (born 1958), US author, book restorer and Internet performance artist
 James Downey (academic) (1939–2022), Canadian academic
 James Downey (rugby union) (born 1981), rugby union player
 Jim Downey (politician) (born 1942), politician in Manitoba, Canada
 Jim Downey (comedian) (born 1952), American comedian and writer on Saturday Night Live
 Jimmy Downey (born 1987), Australian football (soccer) player
 James Downey (journalist), Irish journalist and author